Janelee Marcus Chaparro Colón (born September 12, 1991 in Barceloneta), known professionally as Janelee Chaparro, is a Puerto Rican model and beauty queen who represented Puerto Rico at Miss World 2012 where she finished in the Top 30 and at Miss Grand International 2013 where she became the first winner in the pageant's history.

Personal life

Chaparro was born in Barceloneta, Puerto Rico to Sonia Colón and Sergio Chaparro, both pastors. In August, 2019, Colón gave birth to a baby girl.

Pageant participation

Miss Mundo de Puerto Rico 2011
Chaparro competed in Miss Mundo de Puerto Rico 2011, representing Barceloneta, where she placed 1st Runner-Up to Amanda Vilanova of San Juan. On April 26, 2012, Janelee was appointed as Miss Mundo de Puerto Rico 2012 in a press conference as no competition was held that year.

Miss World 2012
Chaparro represented Puerto Rico at Miss World 2012 pageant, held at Ordos, China on August 18, 2012 where she placed in the Top 30.

Miss Grand International 2013
Janelee represented Puerto Rico at the first Miss Grand International pageant on November 19, 2013, where she won becoming the first winner in the pageant's history. During her reign, she had travelled to Myanmar, Cambodia, Malaysia, South Sudan, Thailand, Puerto Rico, Singapore and Philippines.

References

External links

Miss Grand International winners
1991 births
Living people
People from Barceloneta, Puerto Rico
Puerto Rican beauty pageant winners
Miss World 2012 delegates